Revalenta Arabica, or Ervalenta, was a preparation sold in the 18th century as an empirical diet for patients, extraordinary restorative virtues being attributed to it.

The product that was mass-marketed was, in reality, only a preparation of the common lentil, its first name being formed for disguise by the transposition of its earlier botanical name, Ervum lens. While indeed lentils are a healthy and nutritious food, Revalenta Arabica's value was about similar to the common pea-meal (or ground split peas).

Original 
The real Revalenta arabica is the "root" of Glossostemon bruguieri. The roots were sold under the name Arabgossi. In Egypt, they are known as Moghat. The original plant of the product was unknown for a long time, until the German Africa explorer and botanician Georg Schweinfurth discovered Glossostemon bruguieri as its source.

They are prepared as a light dish for ailing or ill persons. Plant and usage are described already in Firdous al-Hikmah („Paradise of Wisdom“) of Ali al-Tabari, a medicinal encyclopedia from the 9th century AD.

References
This article incorporates text from the International Cyclopedia of 1890, a publication now in the public domain.

Legume dishes
Medical treatments
Byttnerioideae